State Route 75 (SR-75) is a state highway in the U.S. state of Utah.

Route description
The route's western end is at exit 265 of I-15, in the northwest part of Springville. From there, it travels just over 2 miles to the east, to its intersection with US-89 (Main Street) in the northeast part of Springville at the base of the Wasatch Mountains.

SR-75 is part of the National Highway System.

History
This route was approved as a state highway in 1962, and has remained unchanged since then, save for rewording the description to reflect the renumbering of Route 1 to Route 15, and Route 8 to Route 89 in the 1977 Utah state route renumbering.

Major intersections

References

075
 075
Springville, Utah
Streets in Utah